Der Hexer may refer to:
 The Ringer (1932 film), an Austrian-German mystery film
 Der Hexer (1964 film), a West German black and white mystery film